Loveland may refer to:

Places
Lake Loveland, a reservoir on Sweetwater River in California
Loveland Dam, a dam on Lake Loveland in California
Loveland, Colorado
Loveland Ski Area, Colorado
Loveland Pass, Colorado
Loveland, Iowa
Loveland, New York
Loveland, Ohio
Loveland, Oklahoma
Loveland, Washington, a former town in Pierce County

Music
Loveland (band), an electronic musical group
Loveland (R. Kelly album), an unreleased R. Kelly album
Loveland (John Sykes album)
Loveland, a 1978 album by Lonnie Liston Smith

Other uses
Loveland (surname)
Loveland (TV series), a cancelled British dating game show
Loveland (film), an Australian film
Loveland Building and Coors Building, a building in Golden, Colorado
Loveland frog, a legendary creature from Ohio

See also
Loveland High School (disambiguation)

Love Land (disambiguation)
Løvland, a Norwegian surname